The 2018 Clare Senior Football Championship will be the 123rd staging of the Clare Senior Football Championship since its establishment by the Clare County Board in 1887.

The defending champions and holders of the Jack Daly Cup were Kilmurry-Ibrickane who retained their crown to win their fifteenth overall senior title in October 2017.	

In 2017 it was decided that from 2019 onwards the Clare Senior Football Championship would be cut from sixteen to twelve teams. This means that five clubs will lose their senior status and be relegated down to the Clare Intermediate Football Championship for 2019. The eleven remaining senior clubs will be joined by the 2018 intermediate champions to form the new championship.

Senior Championship Fixtures/Results

First round
 Eight winners advance to Round 2A (winners)
 Eight losers move to Round 2B (Losers)

Second round

A. Winners
 Played by eight winners of Round 1
 Four winners advance to Quarter-finals
 Four losers move to Round 3

B. Losers
 Played by eight losers of Round 1
 Four winners move to Round 3
 Four losers are relegated to Intermediate for 2019

Third round
 Played by four losers of Round 2A & four winners of Round 2B
 Four winners advance to Quarter-finals
 Four losers of this round divert to Senior B

Quarter-finals
 Played by four winners of Round 2A and four winners of Round 3

Semi-finals

County Final

Other Fixtures

Senior B Championship 
 Played by four losers of Round 3

Relegation Playoff 
 Played by two losers of Senior B Semi-finals
 Winner remains in Senior Championship for 2019
 Loser relegated to Intermediate for 2019

References

External links

Clare Senior Football Championship
Clare Senior Football Championship